All Apologies (愛的替身 Ai De Ti Shen) is a 2012 Chinese drama film directed by Emily Tang. It had its premiere on September 26, 2012 at the San Sebastián International Film Festival.

Plot
The film is set in Guilin, Guangxi.

Cast
Cheng Taishen as Cheng Yonggui
Yang Shuting  as Li Qiaoyu
Liang Jing  as Yunzhen
Gao Jin  as He Man
Ge Ge
Qu Yi as Dazhuang
Tang Xi
Chen Bing as Huang
Yang Shu
Zou Xi as Tie Niu
Xiao Ji'nan
Gao Yi'nan

Reception
At the 2012 San Sebastián International Film Festival the film was in the Official Selection, in competition for the Golden Shell. It was shown in the A Window on Asian Cinema section at the 17th Busan International Film Festival.

On Film Business Asia, Derek Elley gave the film a grade of 6 out of 10, calling it an "affecting story of surrogate motherhood".

References

External links

2012 drama films
2012 films
Chinese drama films
Films set in Guangxi
Guilin